State Route 132 (SR 132) is a  state highway that runs south-to-north through south-central portions of Telfair County in the central part of the U.S. state of Georgia.

Route description
It heads northeast to an intersection with SR 165 before it meets its northern terminus, an intersection with US 319/US 441/SR 31 in the southern part of McRae.

SR 132 is not part of the National Highway System.

Major intersections

See also

References

External links

 Georgia Roads (Routes 121 - 140)

132
Transportation in Telfair County, Georgia